Telesoft Technologies is a privately held UK based technology company which develops cyber security, telecoms mobile products and services and government infrastructure. Telesoft has operations in USA, UK and India.

Products
Its Cyber Security products include high rate network flow monitoring appliances that operate on multi 100Gbps networks, collection and analysis software and high rate event driven traffic recorders for anomaly, DDoS, Crypto-jacking and breech detection, and low latency historical analysis and profiling for incident response.

In 2022 Telesoft launched their Managed Detection and Response Service, providing 24/7 human-led threat hunting, active response and a range of other cyber solutions from their UK based Security Operations Centre (SOC).

Timeline
 1989: Telesoft Technologies founded
 1989: SS7 on a card, allowing early Computer Telephony Integration, and opening up the SS7 Market to smaller suppliers
 1991: 1st passive network monitoring probes developed for Homeland Security & Intelligence 
 1994: OKEFORD Protocol Converter and Open Programmable Switch launched
 1995: Telesoft Technologies opens Americas office in Atlanta, GA
 1997: Telesoft Technologies moved into Blandford Forum HQ
 1999: ANSTY network monitoring product range for OSS/VAS launched
 2000: Telesoft Technologies adds new building to Blandford Forum campus
 2007: OKEFORD Media Platform/IVR launched for automated speech recognition and response, allowing VUI rather than GUI interfaces
 2008: OKEFORD Media Platform certified VoiceXML compliant
 2008: Telesoft Technologies opens India Office in Noida
 2009: Telesoft Technologies acquires Think Engine Networks and Cognitronics in Danbury, CT
 2009: Telesoft releases the MPAC 3240/45 and MPAC 3250
 2010: ARNE IVR introduced to service value added service applications for OEMs and system integrators in the telecoms market.
 2011: THINK Engine is a FPGA accelerated probe for session discovery and meta-data extraction of user session content on 3G Gn
 2012: MPAC 6010 & 6010 provides accelerated I/O, DPI and packet processing with embedded filtering and routing, enabling compact and powerful systems to be built for 10Gb Ethernet networks.
 2013: Triton is an Easy to use, portable, all in one multi-application test tool for development, test and installation engineers to rapidly find faults and validate performance of LTE/EPC, VoLTE/IMS and 3G networks.
 2014: TUNA 100G Filters, records and provides playback at 48Gbit/s, with guaranteed hardware timed play-out synchronisation. Analyse and record sessions based on VLAN, MPLS and variable position patterns
 2015: SS7 Firewall, High capacity SS7 Intrusion Prevention System (IPS) enforces rules and GSMA best practice at your network border to prevent abuse and attacks in your SS7 network
 2015: Telesoft releases virtualised version of the ARNE IVR systems (vARNE)
 2016: Officially opens Extreme Cyber lab in Annapolis Junction, Maryland, US
 2016: MPAC Security, enhanced 40Gbit/s capture card offloads signature detection to accelerate bespoke IDS applications and Open Source Suricata
 2016: IPFIX Probe, monitor networks in real-time to diagnose network issues and maintain security with the ultra high performance IPFIX Probe
 2016: Is selected as Gartner Cool Vendor in Security for Technology and Service Providers, 2016
 2016: Telesoft moves Indian Office to Tapasya Corp Heights
 2016: Telesoft releases new features for the vARNE and OKEFORD 5500
 2017: Telesoft selected as a finalist in the Cyber Security Awards for the most Innovative Product of the Year Award 
 2017: Telesofts Data Analytics Capability (TDAC) is officially released in early 2017 
 2017: Event Driven record feature is added to the CERNE 40Gbps IDS Platform
 2018: New features and functionality added the FlowProbe
 2019: The FlowStash is officially released
 2019: The Triton 400 is officially released
 2019: The Flowprobe 400 is officially released
 2022: Managed Detection and Response Service launched

References

External links
Official Website
VoiceXML Forum
Avalanche Technology

Speech recognition
Deep packet capture
Networking hardware companies
Computer network organizations
Telecommunications in the United Kingdom